Un uomo a metà (internationally released as Almost a Man and Half a Man) is a 1966 Italian drama film  directed by Vittorio De Seta.  The film entered the competition at the 1966 Venice Film Festival, in which Jacques Perrin was awarded with the Volpi Cup for Best Actor.

Plot
While locked up in a mental health clinic, Michele looks back on his life. This includes reflecting on his controlling mother and selfish brother, who influenced Michele's neurosis that makes it difficult for him to establish relationships with women.

Cast 
 Jacques Perrin as Michele
 Lea Padovani as Madre di Michele
 Gianni Garko as Fratello di Michele
 Ilaria Occhini as Elena
 Rosemary Dexter as Marina
 Pier Paolo Capponi as Ugo
 Francesca De Seta as Simonetta
 Kitty Swan as Girl at park 
 Ivan Rassimov

Music

All music by Ennio Morricone.

 "Requiem Per Un Destino" – 23:08 (Chorus and orchestra)

References

External links

1966 films
Italian drama films
1960s Italian-language films
1960s Italian films